Iglandini de Jesús González Pardo (born 5 February 1965) long-distance runner from Colombia, who twice represented her native country at the Summer Olympics in the women's marathon race (1996 and 2000). She set her personal best – and the Colombian national record (2:35:19) – in the classic distance on 3 March 1996 in Los Angeles, United States.

Achievements

References
 
 

1965 births
Living people
Colombian female long-distance runners
Olympic athletes of Colombia
Athletes (track and field) at the 1996 Summer Olympics
Athletes (track and field) at the 2000 Summer Olympics
Athletes (track and field) at the 1999 Pan American Games
Athletes (track and field) at the 2003 Pan American Games
Colombian sportspeople in doping cases
Doping cases in athletics
Pan American Games medalists in athletics (track and field)
Pan American Games silver medalists for Colombia
Central American and Caribbean Games bronze medalists for Colombia
Competitors at the 2006 Central American and Caribbean Games
Central American and Caribbean Games medalists in athletics
Medalists at the 1999 Pan American Games
20th-century Colombian women
21st-century Colombian women